Quattro Venti is a minor railway station of Rome, located in the district of Monteverde, between the stations of Roma Trastevere and Roma San Pietro.

The management of the facilities is entrusted to Rete Ferroviaria Italiana, a company of the Ferrovie dello Stato group, which classifies the station in the "Silver" category.

Overview
It is served by trains of the FR3 line, forming an intermediate stop between Trastevere railway station and San Pietro railway station. The station is located between Viale dei Quattro Venti and Via Antonio Cesari, at the foot of the Janiculum hill.

The station was inaugurated officially on 16 November 2006, after 7 years of construction. It is the second deepest railway station of Europe, after one of the railway stations of Prague.

Interchanges 
ATAC bus stop

Services
On weekdays, the following frequencies are offered:
4 trains per hour for Roma Ostiense railway station
4 trains per hour to Cesano,
of which 1 continues to Bracciano
and 1 to Bracciano and Viterbo
Sundays and holidays see a diminished service.

Quattro Venti
Railway stations located underground in Italy
Railway stations opened in 2006
Rome Q. XII Gianicolense